United States Numbered Highways in the state of Virginia are numbered by the American Association of State Highway and Transportation Officials (AASHTO) and maintained by the Virginia Department of Transportation as part of the system of state highways. In Virginia, U.S. Highways are treated, for funding purposes, as identical to primary state highways and receive more funding than secondary state routes.


Mainline highways

Special routes

See also

References

External links

Road Signs of Virginia
Virginia Highway Endpoints
Virginia Highways Project
AARoads Virginia Highways Page

US